

C05A Agents for treatment of hemorrhoids and anal fissures for topical use

C05AA Corticosteroids
C05AA01 Hydrocortisone
C05AA04 Prednisolone
C05AA05 Betamethasone
C05AA06 Fluorometholone
C05AA08 Fluocortolone
C05AA09 Dexamethasone
C05AA10 Fluocinolone acetonide
C05AA11 Fluocinonide
C05AA12 Triamcinolone

C05AB Antibiotics

C05AD Local anesthetics
C05AD01 Lidocaine
C05AD02 Tetracaine
C05AD03 Benzocaine
C05AD04 Cinchocaine
C05AD05 Procaine
C05AD06 Oxetacaine
C05AD07 Pramocaine

C05AE Muscle relaxants
C05AE01 Glyceryl trinitrate
C05AE02 Isosorbide dinitrate
C05AE03 Diltiazem

C05AX Other agents for treatment of hemorrhoids and anal fissures for topical use
C05AX01 Aluminium preparations
C05AX02 Bismuth preparations, combinations
C05AX03 Other preparations, combinations
C05AX04 Zinc preparations
C05AX05 Tribenoside

C05B Antivaricose therapy

C05BA Heparins or heparinoids for topical use
C05BA01 Organo-heparinoid
C05BA02 Sodium apolate
C05BA03 Heparin
C05BA04 Pentosan polysulfate sodium
C05BA51 Heparinoid, combinations
C05BA53 Heparin, combinations

C05BB Sclerosing agents for local injection
C05BB01 Monoethanolamine oleate
C05BB02 Polidocanol
C05BB03 Invert sugar
C05BB04 Sodium tetradecyl sulfate
C05BB05 Phenol
C05BB56 Glucose, combinations

C05BX Other sclerosing agents
C05BX01 Calcium dobesilate
C05BX51 Calcium dobesilate, combinations

C05C Capillary stabilising agents

C05CA Bioflavonoids
C05CA01 Rutoside
C05CA02 Monoxerutin
C05CA03 Diosmin
C05CA04 Troxerutin
C05CA05 Hidrosmin
C05CA51 Rutoside, combinations
C05CA53 Diosmin, combinations
C05CA54 Troxerutin, combinations

C05CX Other capillary stabilising agents
C05CX01 Tribenoside
C05CX02 Naftazone
C05CX03 Hippocastani semen

References

C05